Pyotr Ilyich Klimuk (born 10 July 1942) is a former Soviet cosmonaut and the first Belarusian to perform space travel. Klimuk made three flights into space. From 1991 to 2003, he headed the Yuri Gagarin Cosmonaut Training Center.

Life

Klimuk attended the Leninski Komsomol Chernigov High Aviation School and entered the Soviet Air Force in 1964. The following year, he was selected to join the space programme.

His first flight was a long test flight on Soyuz 13 in 1973. This was followed by a mission to the Salyut 4 space station on Soyuz 18 in 1975.

From 1976 he became involved in the Intercosmos and made his third and final spaceflight on an Intercosmos flight with Polish cosmonaut Mirosław Hermaszewski on Soyuz 30 in 1978.

He resigned from the cosmonaut team in 1978 to take up a position as the Assistant to the Chief of the Gagarin Cosmonaut Training Center. In 1991 he was promoted to Chief of that facility and remained in that post until retirement in 2003.

Klimuk is a graduate of the Gagarin Air Force Academy and the Lenin Military-Political Academy.

He is the author of two books on human spaceflight: Beside the Stars, and Attack on Weightlessness.

Honours and awards
 Hero of the Soviet Union, twice (1973, 1975)
 Pilot-Cosmonaut of the USSR
 Order of Merit for the Fatherland;
3rd class (2 March 2000) – a great service to the state in the development of manned space flight
4th class (1996)
 Three Orders of Lenin (1973, 1975, 1978)
 Order for Service to the Homeland in the Armed Forces of the USSR, 3rd class (1984)
 Medal "For Merit in Space Exploration" (12 April 2011) – for the great achievements in the field of research, development and use of outer space, many years of diligent work, public activities
 Order "For Service to Motherland", 2nd class (Belarus, 15 July 2002) – for services to develop and strengthen scientific, technological and military cooperation

 Order of Friendship of Peoples (Belarus) (16 July 2007) – for his significant contribution to strengthening the friendly relations and cooperation between Belarus and the Russian Federation
 Cross of Grunwald, 1st class (NDP, 1978)
 Order of Parasat (Kazakhstan, 1995)
 Officer of the Legion of Honour (France, 2004)
 Medal, "Brotherhood in Arms", twice (Poland)
 Medal "For the strengthening of friendship in Arms", 1st class (Czechoslovakia)
 Medal "100th anniversary of the fall of the Ottoman yoke" (NRB)
 Medal "from the grateful people of Afghanistan" (1988)
 USSR State Prize (1978) – for his work on medical justification and implementation of complex methods and means of preventing the adverse effects of weightlessness on the human body, allowing for the possibility of prolonged manned space flights
 Lenin Komsomol Prize (1978) – script for the documentary "Common Space"
 Tsiolkovski Gold Medal
 Gagarin Gold Medal
 Gold Medal from the Polish Academy of Sciences
 Honorary citizen of the cities of Kaluga, Gagarin, and Dzhezkasgan

Books 
 
 The official website of the city administration Baikonur - Honorary citizens of Baikonur

References

1942 births
Living people
People from Brest District
Soviet cosmonauts
1973 in spaceflight
Heroes of the Soviet Union
Soviet Air Force officers
Recipients of the Order "For Merit to the Fatherland", 3rd class
Recipients of the Order of Lenin
Recipients of the Order of the Cross of Grunwald, 1st class
Officiers of the Légion d'honneur
Recipients of the USSR State Prize
Recipients of the Lenin Komsomol Prize
Recipients of the Order of Parasat
Recipients of the Medal "For Merit in Space Exploration"
Recipients of the Medal of Zhukov
Lenin Military Political Academy alumni
Salyut program cosmonauts